The 1993 Virginia Slims of Los Angeles was a women's tennis tournament played on outdoor hard courts at the Manhattan Country Club in Manhattan Beach, California in the United States that was part of the Tier II category of the 1993 WTA Tour. It was the 20th edition of the tournament and was held from August 9 through August 15, 1993. Second-seeded Martina Navratilova won the singles title, her eighth at the event, and earned $75,000 first-prize money.

Finals

Singles
 Martina Navratilova defeated  Arantxa Sánchez Vicario 7–5, 7–6(7–4)
 It was Navratilova's 4th singles title of the year and the 164th of her career.

Doubles
 Arantxa Sánchez Vicario /  Helena Suková defeated  Gigi Fernández /  Natasha Zvereva 7–6(7–3), 6–3

See also
 1993 Volvo Tennis/Los Angeles – men's tournament

References

External links
 ITF tournament edition details
 Tournament draws

Virginia Slims of Los Angeles
LA Women's Tennis Championships
Sports competitions in Manhattan Beach, California
Virginia Slims of Los Angeles
Virginia Slims of Los Angeles
Virginia Slims of Los Angeles
Virginia Slims of Los Angeles